Grimes Covered Bridge was a historic wooden covered bridge located in Washington Township in Greene County, Pennsylvania. It crossed Ruff Creek. As of October 1978, it was one of nine historic covered bridges in Greene County.

It was listed on the National Register of Historic Places in 1979. In November 1992, it was destroyed in a fire.

References 

Covered bridges on the National Register of Historic Places in Pennsylvania
Covered bridges in Greene County, Pennsylvania
Bridges completed in 1888
Wooden bridges in Pennsylvania
Bridges in Greene County, Pennsylvania
National Register of Historic Places in Greene County, Pennsylvania
Road bridges on the National Register of Historic Places in Pennsylvania
King post truss bridges in the United States